Aharodniki is a village in Belarus. It is located in the Kamenets District, Brest Region, 338 km south of the capital Minsk.

External links 
 
 Location including the places

Villages in Belarus
Populated places in Brest Region
Kamenets District
Grodno Governorate
Polesie Voivodeship